Showdown! is a collaborative blues album by guitarists Albert Collins, Robert Cray and Johnny Copeland, released in 1985 through Alligator Records. The album is mostly made of original material, with cover versions of songs like T-Bone Walker's "T-Bone Shuffle", Muddy Waters's "She's into Something" and Ray Charles' "Blackjack". Collins, Cray and Copeland were supported by Johnny B. Gayden and Allen Batts, who at the time were members of Collins' Icebreakers, and Alligator's household artist Casey Jones. In the album's sleeve notes, producers Bruce Iglauer and Dick Shurman observe how Copeland and Cray were both given support by Collins early in their career, and how the three musicians have often crossed paths since then, making this collaborative effort a "thirty years in the making" project. Showdown! was one of Alligator's most successful albums, peaking at n. 124 on the US charts and selling over 175,000 units worldwide. The album won a Grammy Award for Best Traditional Blues Recording in 1986. It was re-released on CD by Alligator in 2011.

In a retrospective review, AllMusic noted that "Cray's delivery of Muddy Waters' rhumba-rocking "She's into Something" was one of the set's many highlights".

Track listing
"T-Bone Shuffle" (T-Bone Walker) – 4:54
"The Moon Is Full" (Gwen Collins) – 4:59
"Lion's Den" (Johnny Copeland) – 3:55
"She's Into Something" (Carl Wright) – 3:49
"Bring Your Fine Self Home" (Johnny Copeland) – 4:30
"Black Cat Bone" (Ivory Lee Semien, Harding Wilson) – 4:54
"The Dream" (Robert Cray, David Amy) – 5:28
"Albert's Alley" (Albert Collins) – 4:01
"Blackjack" (Ray Charles) – 6:26

Personnel
Albert Collins - guitar, harmonica, vocals
Robert Cray - guitar, vocals
Johnny Copeland - guitar, vocals
Johnny B. Gayden - bass
Allen Batts - organ
Casey Jones - drums

References

1985 albums
Robert Cray albums
Albert Collins albums
Johnny Copeland albums
Alligator Records albums
Albums produced by Bruce Iglauer
Collaborative albums